Christopher James Tremie (born October 17, 1969) is an American former professional baseball catcher. After his MLB debut, Tremie had stints with eight minor league teams (Nashville, Reading, Oklahoma, Atlantic City, Newark, Calgary, Round Rock, and New Orleans) and three MLB teams (Texas Rangers, Pittsburgh Pirates, and Houston Astros). Tremie retired in 2005 as a member of the Astros' Triple-A affiliate Round Rock Express. Tremie played NCAA baseball with the University of Houston Cougars.

Tremie managed the Gulf Coast Indians (rookie-level affiliate of the Cleveland Indians) to a 21-29 record in 2006. He served as the manager of the Single-A Kinston Indians in 2009, of the Arizona League Indians in 2010, and of the Akron Aeros in 2011. He was the manager of the Columbus Clippers (2013–2018). He compiled a 852-809 record as a minor league manager in the Cleveland Indians organization before being hired by the Cincinnati Reds as a minor league field coordinator.

See also
 List of University of Houston people

References

External links

1969 births
Living people
American expatriate baseball players in Canada
Atlantic City Surf players
Baseball players from Texas
Birmingham Barons players
Calgary Cannons players
Chicago White Sox players
Gulf Coast White Sox players
Hickory Crawdads players
Houston Astros players
Houston Cougars baseball players
Major League Baseball catchers
Minor league baseball managers
Nashville Sounds players
New Orleans Zephyrs players
Newark Bears players
Oklahoma RedHawks players
Pittsburgh Pirates players
Reading Phillies players
Round Rock Express players
Sarasota White Sox players
Texas Rangers players
Utica Blue Sox players